Stephen of Armenia (1111 – 7 February 1165) was the Marshal of Armenia, the son of Leo I, Prince of Armenia and Beatrice de Rethel.

His father made him Marshal in 1138, due to the invasion of John II Comnenus, and escaped capture by sheltering in Edessa. In 1157, he began raiding Byzantine territories around Marash against his half-brother Thoros' will, although he failed to capture Marash itself. The Byzantine governor of Tarsus, Andronicus Euphorbenus, invited him to a banquet. Stephen's corpse was found the next day and it was believed Andronicus murdered him. Thoros avenged his death with a massacre of Greeks within his territories, which would have led to war had not Amalric I of Jerusalem intervened to bring about a peace.

He had at least three children by his wife Rita of Barbaron: 
Ruben III
Leo II
Dolete, who married Bertrand Embriaco

Notes

References

External links
 Smbat Sparapet's Chronicle
 The Barony of Cilician Armenia (Kurkjian's History of Armenia, Ch. 27)

1165 deaths
Murdered royalty
Year of birth unknown
1111 births